Eastern Asian Women's Volleyball Championship is an international volleyball competition in East Asia for national teams of the Eastern Asia Zonal Volleyball Association (EAZVA). Tournaments have been awarded every two years since 1998. The current champion is Japan, which won its five title at the 2018 tournament.

The 2018 Eastern Asian Championship took place in Zhangjiagang, China.

Results summary

Teams reaching the top four

Medal summary

Participating nations

Awards

Most Valuable Player

Best Coach

References

External links
 Official AVC website

East Asia Volleyball Championship
Recurring sporting events established in 2014
Volleyball competitions in Asia